Events from the year 1435 in France

Incumbents
 Monarch – Charles VII

Events
 2 February – The French-born René of Anjou becomes King of Naples
 9 May – The Battle of Gerberoy is fought between France and England
 21 September – The Treaty of Arras is agreed between Charles VII and Philip the Good leads to the end of the Anglo-Burgundian Alliance. This is major blow to long-term English hopes during the Hundred Years War
 4 October – The siege of Saint-Denis ends in an English victory

Births
 4 May – Joan of France, Duchess of Bourbon, princes (died 1482)
 Unknown – Jean Molinet, writer and composer (died 1507)
 Unknown – Jean de Baudricourt, Marshal of France (died 1499)

Deaths
 24 September – Isabeau of Bavaria, former Queen of France (born 1370)

References

1430s in France